Dousti Square is a square in Dushanbe, Tajikistan. It is connected to Rudaki Avenue and Hofizi Sherozi Avenue. It is the largest in Dushanbe.

History 
The formation of the square began in the 1930s. Its first building was a 2-storeyed building of the Main Post Office on the axis of Lenin Avenue. In the years 1940-1946 a three-story building of the Government House is being built on the square. In 1949, the symbol of the Tajik Soviet Socialist Republic was erected in the southern part of the square, an obelisk column with the emblem of the Tajik SSR (architect S. Anisimov, sculptor B. Tatarinov). In 1961 on the western side of the square, a bronze sculpture of Lenin was erected with the governmental tribune. Thus, the formation of square is being completed. According to the general plan of the city of Dushanbe, in 1966, and then in 1983, a wide green esplanade overlooking the river was projected Dushanbe. After the independence was declared in 1991, the monument of the greatest poet of the east, Ferdowsi, appeared on the site of the monument to Lenin which was torn down on the night of 22 September and the square was named "Ozodi" (Freedom). The square was given its current name of Dousti in 1997. In 1999, the square was due for reconstruction. After the restoration of the square, The monument to Ismoil Somoni was installed in 1999 in honor of the 1100th anniversary of the Samanid State.

Landmarks

Other Landmarks
 The Tajik Foreign Affairs, Agriculture, Transport and Communications ministries are also located on the square
In 2018, Tajikistan’s tallest ever New Year's tree was installed on the square. In 2015, a tree was installed at Dousti Square for the first time.

Events

State events 
Dousti Square exclusively holds military parades and demonstrations on the occasion of national holidays such as Independence Day, Army Day, Victory Day and before 1990, October Revolution Day, and International Workers' Day. The first parade in Dushanbe (Stalinabad) took place on Red Square on 7 November 1945, with the participation of the 201st Motor Rifle Division, attended by infantry units and military equipment (artillery, armored vehicles, tanks). Revolution Day parades were moved to the modern square in the 1960s. Victory Day Parades were also held on the square in 1965 and 1985. Over the course of all Soviet era parade, vehicles such as the T-72, BTR-80, KAMAZ and the BM-21 Grad rolled through the square. The last Soviet parade was held on the square on 7 November 1990.

The first military parade of independent Tajikistan took place on the square on 23 February 1993, in honor of the founding of the Tajik National Army, which took place that same day. Participants in the parade were attended an induction ceremony in the presence of President Rahmon Nabiyev prior to the start of the parade.

The square also hosted the final part of the inaugurations of President Emomali Rahmon in 2006, 2013, and 2020.

Rallies 

During the Tajik Civil War, many rallies supporting either the government of the rebels took place on the square. Protests on the square also took place from 1990-1991 in opposition to Soviet policies.

Gallery

See also 
 Independence Square, Nur-Sultan
Independence Square, Ashgabat
Mustaqillik Maydoni
Ala-Too Square

References 

Buildings and structures in Dushanbe
Squares in Tajikistan
National squares